Triple B Football Club is a Zimbabwean football club based in Beitbridge. They play in the second division of Zimbabwean football, the Zimbabwe Division One.

League participations
Zimbabwe Premier Soccer League: ?-2013
Zimbabwe Division One: 2013–

Stadium
Currently the team plays at the 4000 capacity Dulibadzimu Stadium.

References

External links
Soccerway
Calciozz

Football clubs in Zimbabwe